Tina Kirkman (born 23 December 1969) is an Australian judoka. She competed in the women's extra-lightweight event at the 1996 Summer Olympics.

References

External links
 

1969 births
Living people
Australian female judoka
Olympic judoka of Australia
Judoka at the 1996 Summer Olympics
Sportspeople from Sydney
20th-century Australian women
21st-century Australian women